Events from the year 1808 in Sweden

Incumbents
 Monarch – Gustav IV Adolf

Events
 21 February - Finnish War
 2 May - Battle of Pulkkila
 2 March - Siege of Sveaborg
 14 March - Dano-Swedish War of 1808–09 starts.
 16 April - Battle of Pyhäjoki
 18 April - Battle of Siikajoki
 27 April - Battle of Revolax
 28 April - Battle of Furuholm
 19–20 June - Battle of Lemo
 August - Jämtland Campaign of 1808
 27 October - Battle of Koljonvirta
 18 September - Battle of Palva Sund
 26–28 September - Helsinki village landing
 - Jöns Jacob Berzelius publishes the second part of his Föreläsningar i Djurkemien.
 - Elisa Servenius enlists in the Swedish army dressed as a man because "She had decided to live and to die with her husband", the soldier Bernhard Servenus; she participates in the war between Sweden and Russia about Finland, and during one battle, she collected the ammunition of the Russians and gave them to her comrades. She is later discovered, fired but decorated with a medal for bravery in battle.
 - The first school for the deaf and mute in Sweden is founded by Pär Aron Borg.

Births
 6 March - Sofia Adlersparre, painter  (died 1862)
 8 September – Wendela Hebbe, reporter, often called the first female reporter of her country  (died 1899)
 - Emanuel Björling, mathematician  (died 1872)
 21 October - Maria Christina Bruhn, inventor  (born 1732)
 28 December - Andreas Bruce, transsexual memoir writer  (died 1885)

Deaths
 3 January – Fredrika Eleonora von Düben, artist (born 1738)
 26 February - Lovisa Simson, theater director  (born 1746)
 19 August - Fredrik Henrik af Chapman, shipbuilder  (born 1721)
 30 March – Gustaf Fredrik Gyllenborg, writer (born 1731)
 1 October – Thomas Thorild, poet (born 1759)
 undated - Maria Elisabet Öberg, weaver (born 1734)

References

 
Years of the 19th century in Sweden